Arcadia Bluffs Golf Club, designed by Warren Henderson and Rick Smith, was founded in 1999 in Arcadia, Michigan. The golf course was designed to resemble seaside Irish links, with rolling terrain and windswept natural fescues throughout.

In 2018, Arcadia Bluff(South) was the second golf course added with golf architects Dana Fry/Jason Straka building the MacDonald Raynor inspired design.

References

External links

Official site

Golf clubs and courses in Michigan
Buildings and structures in Manistee County, Michigan
Tourist attractions in Manistee County, Michigan
Sports venues completed in 1999
1999 establishments in Michigan